The Racking Horse World Celebration is the largest show for the Racking Horse breed. It is held annually in late September at the Celebration Arena in Priceville, Alabama, a few miles outside Decatur. The Celebration encompasses over a week of nightly shows, and includes approximately 170 classes. Over 1,000 horses compete there each year, and spectator attendance is roughly 70,000.
The World Celebration's counterpart is the Spring Celebration, held in April at the same location.

History

 
The Celebration was started in 1972, not long after the formation of the Racking Horse Breeders' Association of America (RHBAA). Although most of the organizers were from Birmingham it was decided to hold the show in Priceville, which is in Morgan County, northern Alabama, because the horse center there was the best in the state at the time. The first Celebration lasted one day and included 23 classes. A total of 257 horses were shown. Many of the exhibitors and horses were from the Muscle Shoals area. The competition was patterned after the larger and to some extent, more widely known Tennessee Walking Horse National Celebration, with a World Grand Championship as the largest honor.
The first World Grand Champion Racking Horse was Go Boy's Road Runner in 1972. 
The trainer with the most World Grand Championships was Kenny Ailshie, who won the honor six times; in 1987 on Oil Stock, 1991 and 1992 on Oil Stock's Delight, 1998 on The Finalizer, 2002 on Unreal, and 2006 on Score at Halftime. The first female rider to win the World Grand Championship was Barbara Agnich riding the horse Tragedy in 2005. In a twist, Agnich competed against her boyfriend Rick Parish to win. In 1986, the Racking Horse World and Spring Celebrations were named by the Southeast Tourism Society as being among the top 20 attractions in the Southeastern United States.

Winners
This is a list of World Grand Championship winning horses, trainers, and owners at the Racking Horse World Celebration.

Classes
The Celebration lasts 9 days and nights and includes over 170 classes to accommodate a variety of disciplines, including saddle seat, trail, English pleasure, western riding, driving, speed classes, and even stick horse riding for young children.
All horses entered must be registered with the RHBAA, and the trainer, owner and rider of each horse must also be Association members. All horses entered must have a negative Coggins test and currently be vaccinated against the equine herpes virus.
Multiple World Championships and one World Grand Championship are awarded during the course of the Celebration. One specialty class, called "Racking for the Roses" is designed to showcase the abilities of horses that may not enter the World Grand Championship. Riders in the class must be professional trainers who have been training for at least 5 years and have never won the World Grand Championship. 
The World Grand Championship is the most significant and the final class in the Celebration, held on the last Saturday night of the show. It has a cash prize of $3,000 and a silver tea set for first place. In addition to regular competition, the show includes a horse sale, trainers' association meeting, and youth activities.

The Celebration has average attendance of around 70,000 people annually. It includes about 1,000 horses from 25 US states.

Spring Celebration
The Spring Celebration, formerly known as the Spring Warm-Up is held in mid-to-late April and begins the Racking Horse show season each year. It is very similar in style and level of competition to the World Show, but only lasts four days. It is the second-largest Racking Horse show in the United States.

References

Equestrian sports competitions in the United States
1972 establishments in Alabama
Racking Horses
Sports in Alabama